Hale County is a county located in the U.S. state of Texas. As of the 2020 census, its population was 32,522. The county seat is Plainview. The county was created in 1876 and organized in 1888. It is named for Lt. John C. Hale, a hero of the Battle of San Jacinto. Hale County comprises the Plainview, Texas micropolitan statistical area.

History

In 7000 BC,  Paleo-Indians were the first county inhabitants. Later Native American inhabitants included the Comanche. The Texas Legislature formed Hale County from Bexar County in 1876.  A few years later (1881), brothers T.W. and T.N. Morrison, and W.D. Johnson, established the  Cross L Ranch and the XIT to raise cattle. In 1883, New York Methodist minister Horatio Graves became the first white permanent settler in the county.

The city of Plainview has its beginnings in 1886 when rancher Zachery Taylor Maxwell moved his family and 2,000 sheep from Floyd County to the site of two hackberry groves on the old military trail established by Col. Ranald S. Mackenzie. The city's name comes from the area's vista. The county was organized in 1888, with Plainview as the county seat. By 1900, the county had 259 farms and ranches, with a population of 1,680.

The Santa Fe Railway came to Plainview in 1906,
and Wayland Baptist College was founded the same year.
In 1909, businessman Levi Schick opened the Schick Opera House.
The county's first motor-driven irrigation well was drilled five years later.  The Texas Land and Development Company was organized in Plainview in 1912. Its purpose was to entice settlers by dividing a large tract of land into individual farms, and preparing each farm for occupancy.

The Plainview Site was discovered in 1944. In addition to bone and man-made artifacts, archeologists found the remains of 100 extinct bison about twice the size of modern "buffalo".

Oil was discovered in 1946 in the Anton-Irish field of Lamb and Hale Counties.

Country artist Jimmy Dean,  his brother Don Dean, and cousin-in-law Troy Pritchard founded the Jimmy Dean Sausage Company and opened the Jimmy Dean Meat Company in 1969.
As of 2010, Hale County was one of 62 counties in Texas still legally barring the sale of alcohol.
As of March 7th 2008, Plainview has allowed the sale of packaged alcohol within the city limits.

Geography

Major highways
   Interstate 27/U.S. Highway 87
  Interstate 27 Business
  U.S. Highway 70
  State Highway 194

Adjacent counties
 Swisher County (north)
 Floyd County (east)
 Lubbock County (south)
 Lamb County (west)
 Castro County (northwest)
 Hockley County (southwest)
 Crosby County (southeast)

Demographics

Note: the US Census treats Hispanic/Latino as an ethnic category. This table excludes Latinos from the racial categories and assigns them to a separate category. Hispanics/Latinos can be of any race.

As of the census of 2000,  36,602 people, 11,975 households, and 9,136 families resided in the county.  The population density was 36 people per mi2 (14/km2).  The 13,526 housing units averaged 14 per mi2 (5/km2).  The racial makeup of the county was 66.77% White, 5.79% African American, 0.92% Native American, 0.30% Asian, 23.80% from other races, and 2.42% from two or more races.  About 47.90% of the population was Hispanic or Latino of any race.

Of the 11,975 households, 40.40% had children under the age of 18 living with them, 60.30% were married couples living together, 11.60% had a female householder with no husband present, and 23.70% were not families. About 21% of all households were made up of individuals, and 10.7% had someone living alone who was 65 years of age or older.  The average household size was 2.86 and the average family size was 3.32.

In the county, the population was distributed as 30.20% under the age of 18, 11.40% from 18 to 24, 27.20% from 25 to 44, 18.30% from 45 to 64, and 12.90% who were 65 years of age or older.  The median age was 31 years. For every 100 females there were 102.40 males.  For every 100 females age 18 and over, there were 101.30 males.

Males had a median income of $26,007 versus $20,057 for females. The per capita income for the county was $13,655. About 14.30% of families and 18.00% of the population were below the poverty line, including 23.30% of those under age 18 and 14.80% of those age 65 or over.

Communities

Cities
 Abernathy (small part in Lubbock County)
 Hale Center
 Petersburg
 Plainview (county seat)

Town
 Edmonson

Census-designated place
 Seth Ward

Unincorporated community
 Cotton Center

Ghost town
 Hale City

Politics

Education
School districts serving the county include:
 Abernathy Independent School District
 Cotton Center Independent School District
 Hale Center Independent School District
 Lockney Independent School District
 Olton Independent School District
 Petersburg Independent School District
 Plainview Independent School District

The county is in the service area of South Plains College.

See also

 Dry counties
 National Register of Historic Places listings in Hale County, Texas
 Recorded Texas Historic Landmarks in Hale County

References

External links
 Hale County government's website (under development, but some links)
 
 Hale County Profile from the Texas Association of Counties

 
1888 establishments in Texas
Populated places established in 1888
Majority-minority counties in Texas